Professor Ronald Hinchcliffe (20 February 1926, Bolton –  5 January 2011, Hitchin) was a British audiovestibular physician and academic. He was a founding father of the speciality of audiological (audiovestibular) medicine, the systematic scientific study of disorders of hearing and balance.

References

1926 births
2011 deaths
British scientists
Alumni of the Victoria University of Manchester